Anthony Dominique Sadin (born 24 January 1989) is a Belgian professional footballer who plays as a goalkeeper for Virton.

References

External links

1989 births
Living people
Association football goalkeepers
Challenger Pro League players
Belgian Third Division players
Belgian footballers
Footballers from Hainaut (province)
People from La Louvière
R.E. Virton players
RWDM47 players
Royale Union Saint-Gilloise players